Kodaikanal is a hill station which is located in Dindigul district in the state of Tamil Nadu, India. Its name in the Tamil language means "The Gift of the Forest". Kodaikanal is referred to as the "Princess of Hill stations" and has a long history as a retreat and tourist destination.

Kodaikanal was established in 1845 as a refuge from the high temperatures and tropical diseases of the plains. Much of the local economy is based on the hospitality industry serving tourism. As of 2011, the city had a population of 36,501.

Etymology

It is not known who first used this name or what they intended it to mean.

The word Kodaikanal is an amalgamation of two words: kodai and kanal. The Tamil language has at least four possible interpretations of the name Kodaikanal. By pronouncing the first syllable of Kodaikanal with a long Tamil 'O', as in koe-dei (கோடை), it means "summer", whilst the final two syllables kanal  (காணல்) means "to see", rendering Kodaikanal as a "place to see in summer". Kodaikanal is a summer forest, and it is a place that the first missionaries used as a refuge to escape the overbearing and mosquito-ridden heat of the plains – a place that they would have counted on seeing in the summer.

Kanal, in Tamil, can mean dense or closed forest. In this case, Kodai can have at least four meanings. By pronouncing Kodai with the long Tamil 'o' and short 'e', Ko-dai means "the end". Kodaikanal could mean "the end of the forest" which makes poetic and geographical sense – Kodaikanal is at the crown of the Palani Hills and is effectively surrounded and protected by thick forests.

By pronouncing Kodai with the short Tamil 'o' (as in Kodi), it means "creepers" or vines. Kodaikanal could mean "forest of creepers" or the forest of vines. "The forest of creepers" is thought to be the English language meaning given in 1885 during the early western habitation of the place and is still accepted.

By pronouncing Kodai with a short Tamil 'o', and a long 'e', it might be interpreted to mean "gift", rendering "Kodaikanal" as "gift of the forest". Keeping the short Tamil 'o' but adding a long 'a', Kodai could be understood as the Tamil word for umbrella, where Kodaikanal is a forest fashioned like a protecting umbrella.

Another Tamil word for creeper or vine is valli, the honey collecting daughter of the chief of the Veddas mountain tribe. The chief and his wife prayed to the Mountain God for a girl and their prayers were answered when the chief found a newborn girl child during a hunting expedition. As she was found among creeper plants, they named her Valli and she grew up as princess of the tribe in Kurinji and became the consort of lord Murugan. The romantic traditions of Murugan in Sangam literature are thus associated with the name Kodaikanal.

History

The earliest residents of Kodaikanal were the Palaiyar tribal people. The earliest specific references to Kodaikanal and the Palani Hills are found in Tamil Sangam literature of the early Common era.
Modern Kodaikanal was established by American Christian missionaries and British bureaucrats in 1845, as a refuge from the high temperatures and tropical diseases of the plains. In the 20th century a few elite Indians came to realise the value of this enchanting hill station and started relocating here.

Tourism has been impacted by industrial pollution issues including the closure of a mercury factory owned by Unilever's Indian subsidiary Hindustan Unilever after evidence of widespread mercury pollution. To date no proper clean-up operation has been mounted.

Train
The Kodaikanal-Gudalur Railway line was under the contemplation of the Government from 1889 when the Madras and Travancore Governments made an agreement regarding the waters of the Periyar river in 1895 a survey was made in 1897 after the completion of the Periyar dam, the Government granted permission to the then Wilson and Company, Madras to construct a light railway from Kodaikanal railway station, then Ammaayanaickanur railway station, which lies between Dindigul and Madhurai railway stations, to Gudalur within two years The company failed in floating the capital wanted within the period allotted and thus the permission granted automatically expired. Then the Government made several surveys till 1920 After the close of the First World War, the Government sanction, ed in 1920 this line under the postwar reconstruction scheme and directed the District Board, Madurai to intimate to the Government within two years whether it was willing to take UP this work, as the then South Indian Railway Company and the two planters of the Kannan Devan Hills were willing to undertake the work. In 1922 the district board of Madurai intiiP&ted the Government to cancel the sanction of the Kodaikanal road- Gudalur railway line and requested sanction for the construction of Madurai-Bodinayakanur line Accordingly.

Geography

These hills form the eastward spur of the Western Ghats on the western side of South India. It has an irregular basin as its heartland, the centre of which is now Kodaikanal Lake a  circumference manmade lake. A few kilometres away from Kodaikanal a small village named Vattakanal is located in the Dindigul District on the southern tip of the upper Palani hills in the state of Tamil Nadu, along the eastern coast of the Western Ghats.

Vattakanal is better known as 'Vatta', which means circle and by most or 'Little Israel' by the villagers that observe a large number of Israeli tourists who flock there from October onwards. One of the main attractions of Kodaikanal city, very near to the Upper Lake View, a beautiful waterfall, is Vattakanal Falls. A perfectly calm and quiet place to enjoy waterfalls and natural beauty. 

Meadows and grasslands cover the hillsides. Gigantic eucalyptus trees and shola forests flourish in the valleys. Mighty rocks and cascading streams lie above the valleys. There are many high waterfalls and ubiquitous gardens and flower beds in bloom.

Kodaikanal is known for its rich flora. Of the big trees, cypress, eucalyptus and acacia are the dominant varieties. Pear trees are numerous and the fruits are of high quality. Competing with the fruit trees are the flowering ones, mainly rhododendron and magnolia. Large dahlias of different hues are the main attraction of Bryant Park, situated close to the Kodai lake. At a distance of 700 meters from Kodaikanal Bus Station, Bryant Park is a splendidly maintained backyard located in the direction of the South-East nook. Water lilies in the park's pond are another pleasing sight. The town abounds in yellow wild flowers.

North of the town, high hills that slope down into the villages of Pallangi and Vilpatti stand guard. On the east the hill slopes less abruptly into the lower Palnis. A precipitous escarpment facing the Cumbum Valley is on the south. On the west is a plateau leading to Manjampatti Valley, Indira Gandhi National Park, the Anamalai Hills and the main body of the Western Ghats of Kerala border. ‘Ecoville,’ an ecological village park set up in Vilpatti panchayat in Dindigul district by retrieving about four acres of encroached land has set an example for other local bodies to replicate and help sustain the ecosystem around them.

Climate
Kodaikanal has a monsoon-influenced subtropical highland climate (Cfb, according to the Köppen climate classification, with a Cwb tendency). The temperatures are cool throughout the year due to the high elevation of the city.

Demographics

According to the 2011 census, Kodaikanal had a population of 36,501 with a sex-ratio of 1,004 females for every 1,000 males, much above the national average of 929. A total of 3,893 were under the age of six, constituting 1,945 males and 1,948 females. Scheduled Castes and Scheduled Tribes accounted for 19.86% and .28% of the population respectively. The average literacy of the city was 79.78%, compared to the national average of 72.99%. The city had a total of 9,442 households. There were a total of 14,103 workers, comprising 163 cultivators, 744 main agricultural labourers, 130 in household industries, 12,118 other workers, 948 marginal workers, 10 marginal cultivators, 51 marginal agricultural labourers, 34 marginal workers in household industries and 853 other marginal workers. As per the religious census of 2011, Kodaikanal had 48.84% Hindus, 12.0% Muslims, 38.69% Christians, 0.02% Sikhs, 0.22% Buddhists, 0.04% Jains, 0.15% following other religions and 0.04% following no religion or did not indicate any religious preference.

Economy

The economy of Kodaikanal predominantly depends on tourism. The number of tourists increased from two million in 1999 to 3.2 million in 2009.
The town's infrastructure changes every year in preparation for the peak tourist season. Major roads are converted into one-way lanes to regulate the constant inflow of traffic and special police are brought in for the safety of the tourists and protection of local businesses. Hotels are often fully booked during the high season, and remain virtually empty during the off-season. Due to the rapid development of nearby cities such as Madurai, Palani and Coimbatore the town is learning to deal with year-round tourism.

Plums, pears, chile peppers, carrots, cauliflower, cabbage, garlic, and onions are cultivated by terrace farmers in surrounding villages. Most are trucked to other parts of India and some are sold in the local market. C

Due to its relatively unpolluted image, various locations in Kodaikanal are used for movie shoots. Some examples are Jo Jeeta Wohi Sikandar though depicted as Dehradun, the Tamil movie Guna, Manmadhan Ambu, and Thenali.

Health
The major medical facilities are KHMS Hospital, Van Allen Hospital, the Government Hospital, and the Prana Spa. These hospitals treat patients with common ailments and injuries and perform child delivery and care, but are not equipped with modern medical equipment for complicated diagnoses and surgery.

KHMS hospital was formed in 2009 to provide quality health care to residents and visitors.

In April 1915, Dr. Van Allen raised funds to construct the first unit of the hospital at the entrance of Coaker's walk. It was named after him. Its facilities have been updated and now it has an X-ray machine, well equipped pathological lab, and operation theatre with blood transfusion facilities. Van Allen Hospital established by a group of Christian missionaries to be a place where people could receive quality medical attention in a picturesque setting of comfort and caring atmosphere in Kodaikanal. Van Allen receives about 7500 as outpatients per year. The number increases during the summer due to the influx of the tourist.

The Government Hospital is situated on the hillside near Rock Cottage on Lower Shola Road. It was a small municipal hospital until 1927. Now it has X-ray, dental, and maternity wards and other facilities.

Kodaikanal mercury poisoning
Air and water-borne mercury emissions have contaminated large areas of Kodaikanal and the surrounding forests. A study conducted by the Department of Atomic Energy confirmed that Kodaikanal Lake has been contaminated by mercury emissions.

Mercury pollution was reported in Kodaikanal affecting lakes in the area. The causes, originating from a Hindustan Unilever thermometer factory nearby, were reported to be dispersal of elemental mercury into the atmosphere from improper storage and dispersal into the water from surface effluents from the factory. These showed mercury levels in the range of 0.2 µg/kg, while in Kodaikanal lake the lichen and moss levels were 7.9 µg/kg and 8.3 µg/kg, respectively. Fish samples were taken from Kodaikanal lake also showed Hg levels in the range of 120 to 290 mg/kg, confirming that pollution of the lake had taken place due to mercury emissions from the factory.

The Hindustan Unilever thermometer factory caused widespread mercury pollution through improper disposal of broken thermometer waste containing large quantities of mercury. The factory sold much of this waste to a junkyard in Kodaikanal and also dumped large quantities in the forest behind the factory. The factory was eventually closed in 2001 after 18 years of operation. Hindustan Lever have used considerable legal manoeuvering to avoid paying compensation to the workers and their families, many of whom died or became physically handicapped as a result of mercury poisoning.

The ex-workers joined to form the 559-strong Ex-Mercury Employees Welfare Association and in 2006 filed a Public Interest Litigation (PIL) suit in the Madras High Court. The association wants an economic rehabilitation scheme, healthcare treatment and a monitoring programme at the company's expense for everyone who ever worked in the factory. It also wants the company prosecuted. Hindustan Unilever denies that any of the health problems of the workers or their families were the result of mercury exposure in the factory. In 2010 the workers were still fighting for compensation.

In June 2007, the Madras High Court constituted a five-member expert committee to decide on the mercury workers' health claims. The last court hearing was in June 2008. The committee later failed to find sufficient evidence to link the current clinical condition of the factory workers to past mercury exposure in the factory.

Additional site remediation studies are being undertaken by national institutions, as desired by the Tamil Nadu Pollution Control Board (TNPCB) and the Court's Scientific Experts Committee (SEC) during the project review meeting in January 2010. IIT Delhi is revalidating the risk assessment study and site-specific clean-up standards; the National Botanical Research Institute, Lucknow, is studying the impact on trees and preservation of trees; and the Centre for Soil and Water Conservation Research and Training Institute, Ooty, is studying the impact on soil and soil erosion. Based on the above study findings, results of remediation trials and recommendations of the SEC, the TNPCB will take a final decision on the clean-up standards. Hindustan Unilever Ltd. will commence soil remediation work at the factory site once a decision on clean-up standards is taken and consent is given by TNPCB.

The Hindustan Unilever, however refused the responsibility for the mercury poisoning even after multiple online petitions and protests by environmental activists.

Education
There are many educational institutions in Kodaikanal. Kodaikanal comes under the Batlagundu educational district. The head office for the educational district serving from Batlagundu government boys higher secondary school.

Schools

Colleges
 Kodaikanal Christian College
 Kodai International Business School
 Kodaikanal Institute of Technology

University
 Mother Teresa Women's University
Mother Teresa Women's University  was founded in 1984 by the enactment of Tamil Nadu Act 15. The university's goal is to expand its services to female students in all communities. Academic courses offered BA, B.Sc, BBA, B.Com, M.Sc, MCA, M.Ed, MBA, PG degree, Ph.D., Certificate Courses.Tamil Nadu Governor R N Ravi has appointed K Kala as Vice-Chancellor of Mother Teresa Women's University, Kodaikanal.

Temples 
There are many Hindu temples in Kodaikanal including the Durgai Amman Kovil, Kurinji Andavar Kovil, Mariamman Kovil, Observatory Murugan Kovil and Vinayagar Kovil. The Muslim mosques are Ellis Villa, Munjikal, Naidupuram, Observatory, Perumal malai and Anna nagar. There is an active community of Tibetan Buddhist refugees.

The Kuzhanthai Velappar temple (Kulandai Velayudha Swami Tirukkovil) has three thousand years of history and was consecrated by Bhogar. The idol is made of Dashabashanam (10 metal alloys). This temple comes under Palani Devasthanam. Every year Poombarai celebrates the Ther Thiruvizha procession for Lord Muruga. This temple was built by the Chera dynasty and still holds 3000-year-old inscriptions.

Churches 

 Christ the King Church Kodaikanal 

Brimming in history and soaked in spirituality, Christ the King Church is a revered CSI church in Kodaikanal. Traces its history from the 19th century, the church is popularly known for its highly-sacred significance and captivating architecture that together lure a larger chunk of travellers and devotees. Christ the King Church was constructed by American Madurai Mission and boasts Gothic style architecture that comprises granite stones. In the initial years, the church was esteemed as Union Church and was a prominent place for natives to offer their prayers to Lord. The main altar of the church is adorned with a beautiful Jesus Christ image. Moreover, the painted glass windows add a grandeur touch the interior of this protestant church in Kodaikanal.

Civil societies

Kodaikanal has several clubs and civil society organizations operating for social, charitable and environmental goals.

In 1890, the Kodaikanal Missionary Union (KMU) was formed to enable missionaries of the various denominations to come together for recreation and to develop a mission strategy and outreach in cooperation with each other. In 1923 it built an Edwardian style clubhouse with large central hall for social events and afternoon teas, six tennis courts, a reading room, and other spaces for meetings. With the decline of missionary activity in India, the KMU was wound up in the 1980s, and the property was turned over to Kodaikanal International School. The KMU library with many valuable old books besides newer materials, is still functioning in one room, and provides something of a social venue. The valuable original KMU archive materials have been incorporated into the archives of the school, which has hired an archivist and is in process of converting the whole original KMU building into an archive and display centre for the school and the community.

Kodaikanal has several social service societies which promote local trade and increase employment of rural villagers in the town's periphery by participating in its tourism fuelled growth. These include the Kodaikanal People Development Group (KOPDEG) which has been successful in providing employment for marginalized women and marketing their products. The Made-in-India tagged products from Kopedeg are unique to Kodaikanal and are targeted at foreign tourists who regularly buy them as souvenirs.

The Cottage Crafts Shop at Anna Salai is run by the voluntary organisation Coordinating Council for Social Concerns in Kodai (CORSOK). They sell goods crafted by development groups and uses the commission charged to help the needy.

In 1994 the Potter's Shed was inaugurated. This pottery and craft Shop in Kodaikanal has made and sold hundreds of thousands of fine pieces of locally made pottery. All profits from this business are contributed to the Bethania Kids Center For Children with Disabilities.

The Kodaikanal Lake Protection Council and Vattakkanal Organization for Youth, Community and Environment (VOYCE) are active in preserving Kodaikanal's environment. Plastic bags are banned and almost all shops and roadside vendors heed the rule and use recycled paper bags in fear of social reprisal. Local hotels have also participated in improving the environment by placing garbage cans all across the town, with their prominent donated by signs acting as silent salesmen.

Places of interest

Kodaikanal has several scenic natural attractions which attract visitors and make it a destination for newlyweds. Young people also come for bike trips and leisure. It is also known for home made chocolates and eucalyptus oil.

These are described in order of distance from the bus-stand.

Kodaikanal Lake is an artificial, roughly star-shaped  lake built in 1863. It is Kodaikanal's most popular geographic landmark and tourist attraction. Rowboats and pedalos can be hired at the Kodaikanal Boat Club. Horses and bicycles can be hired beside the lake for short periods. The  path that skirts the periphery of this lake is a favourite walk for locals and tourists alike.

The park was planned and built in 1908 by a forest officer from Madurai, H.D. Bryant, and named after him. With 325 species of trees, shrubs, and cacti, the park is a rainbow of flowers during the peak season. A large section is dedicated to nearly 740 varieties of roses. 59th Flower show is conducted after the gap of two year in 2022. The annual flower show is held in Kodaikanal in the first or second week of may.  

There is an 1857 eucalyptus tree and a Bodhi tree which adds a religious significance to the park. Ornamental plants are cultivated in a nursery for sale. The park organizes horticultural exhibits and flower shows every summer, to coincide with the peak season. The entrance fee to the park is nominal, and it is open all year.

Coaker's Walk,  from the bus-stand, constructed by Lt. Coaker in 1872, is a  paved pedestrian path running along the edge of steep slopes on the southern side of Kodai. The walk, winding around Mount Nebo, starts in front of the Van Allen hospital, running parallel to the Van Allen Hospital Road, and joins the main road beside St.Peter's Church, providing a panoramic view of the plains. On a clear day one can view as far as Dolphin's Nose in the south, the valley of the Pambar River in the southeast, Periyakulam town and even the city of Madurai. A fascinating rare phenomenon called the Brocken spectre can be witnessed, when a person can see his shadow on the clouds with a rainbow halo. This occurs when the sun is behind the viewer and clouds and mist are to the front. There is an observatory with a telescope halfway along the walk. The entrance fee to the walkway is nominal and it is open all year.

In Poombarai village there is a temple of Lord Muruga. The village is fully covered by reserve forest. The final approach to this quiet area is a gently climbing foot-path.

Green Valley View (formerly called Suicide Point),  from the bus-stand and near the golf course, has a panoramic view of the plains and a sheer drop of  overlooking the Vaigai Dam to the south. The stairway leading up to it is highly commercialized and lined with rows of shops to tempt tourists.

Pine forests: In 1906, with a view to growing valuable timber, H.D. Bryant started
the Kodaikanal pine plantations in the south-west of Kodaikanal.

Shembaganur Museum of Natural History,  from the bus-stand, founded in 1895, is open to the public (except Tuesdays) for viewing their outstanding taxidermy collection of more than 500 species of animals, birds and insects and a living collection of over 300 exotic orchid species. The museum is affiliated with Loyola College in Chennai and exhibits artifacts of the ancient Palaiyar tribespeople whose descendants still live in these hills.

The first observations were commenced here in 1901. Former Director John Evershed discovered the phenomenon of radial motion in sunspots, now known as the Evershed effect. The Kodaikanal Terrestrial Telescope can view a grand panorama including Sothupparai Dam, Vaigai Dam, Periyakulam and Varaha river. This Indian Institute of Astrophysics facility has a comprehensive astronomical science museum with organized public tours, access to the astronomy library, and scheduled night-time telescopic sky viewing. It is open daily to the public during peak season, and a few hours each Friday the rest of the year.

Managed by the Tamil Nadu Forest Department, The viewpoint can be crowded but is not commercialized. There is an excellent public garden adjacent to the viewpoint.

Bear Shola Falls Silver Cascade is the name given to these seasonal waterfalls. Bears were known to come here in search of drinking water many years ago, hence the name. They're in full swing after the monsoon and make for a fantastic experience, especially if you're fascinated by waterfalls.

Guna caves, made popular by the Tamil movie Gunaa, previously called Devil's Kitchen, are deep bat-infested chambers between the three gigantic boulders that are the Pillar Rocks. The deep narrow ravines of the caves are now closed to public due to the deaths of twelve youths there. These dangerous caves are highly protected now, and tourists can see sections of the cave system from afar. In the late 1970s the inside of the caves was well photographed.

Silver Cascade,  from Kodaikanal at a wide bend in the long and winding Laws Ghat Road, at altitude , is a  waterfall formed from the outflow of Kodaikanal Lake. This waterfall is a common stop for first-time visitors. There are a few souvenir and fruit vendors and many monkeys here. There is also a smaller waterfall below the bridge which crosses the stream here.

It is an undisturbed area  down a steep rocky trail beginning soon after Pambar Bridge. Views of steep rocky escarpments rising from the plains can be seen. The old village of Vellagavi can be reached through a rugged bridle path here. A short paved walkway leads from the road here to Pambar Falls (which is also locally addressed as 'Liril Falls' after the Liril Soap advertisement filmed in 1985).

Kurinji Andavar Murugan temple,  from the bus-stand, is known for its Kurinji flower which blossoms in the area only once every 12 years. The deity here is called Sri Kurinji Easwaran, who is Lord Murugan. This temple was built in 1936 by a European woman, who on coming to Ceylon, converted to Hinduism. She changed her name to Leelavathi and married Ponnambalam Ramanathan. She is also known as Lady Ramanathan. This temple was handed over to Arulmighu Dhandayuthapani Swamy Thiru Kovil, Palani by Devi Prasad Bhaskaran (also known as Padmini, niece and adopted daughter of S Natesan Pillai, son-in-law of Lady Ramanathan) and her husband R. Bhaskaran.

The Shrine of La Saleth Church 

For more than 150 years, locals and tourists have made their way to this quaint old church, dedicated to the Lady of La Saleth, to light candles, offer prayer, and lift their voice in worship.

Boating is prohibited as the lake is a source of water for villages. Forest department permission is required and a limited number of vehicles (up to 80) are allowed to enter the forest area where the lake is situated. Entry is restricted into the Berijam Lake area to between 9.30 a.m. and 3 p.m. Bison, deer, panthers, and snakes are often spotted in this area. The fire tower, Silent Valley, Medicine Forest, and Lake View are other attractions around the lake.

To enter into the Berijam Lake permission must be obtained from the Forest Department. Usually, they give permission around 8 a.m. every day except Tuesdays. They give permission to about 80 to 100 vehicles per day and collect an entry fee of around Rs. 150 depending upon the vehicle.

Psilocybin mushrooms which produce hallucinogenic effects when consumed, and other poisonous mushrooms grow around Berijam. Medicine Forest has a certain species of trees whose fragrance is believed to have hallucinogenic effects.

Transport

Air
Almost all distances from Kodaikanal are calculated with the lake as the central point of reference.

The nearest airports are as follows:
 
 Madurai International Airport
 Coimbatore International Airport
 Tiruchirapalli International Airport
 Tuticorin Airport

Train
The nearest railway stations are Palani Station north, Kodaikanal Road Station south east, Oddanchatram Railway Station north east, Dindigul Junction east, and Madurai Junction nearly east.

Bus
From Madurai Aarappalayam bus stand and Batlagundu frequent bus services are available. Buses are also available from Palani, Oddanchatram, Kodairoad, and Dindigul.

There are two main bus routes to reach Kodaikanal – Palani and Batlagundu.

The 2–3-hour drive to Kodaikanal via the steep and winding Ghat roads from Palani, Oddanchatram or Batlagundu is a memorable experience. Travellers may stop at turnouts on the road and view the Palani hills. There is a  shortcut road from Periyakulam to Kodaikanal via Kumbakarai and Adukkam.

Gallery

References

Further reading
 Charlotte Chandler Wyckoff: Kodaikanal: 1845-1945. London Mission Press, Nagercoil, Travancore, Indien. 1945.
 Nora Mitchell: The Indian Hill Station Kodaikanal. Research paper, University of Chicago, Department of Geography, 
No. 141. Chicago Ill., 1972.
 Volker Winkler: Kodaikanal. Land of the Clouds. Hillsboro Press, Franklin (Tennessee) 1999.

External links

 
Tourism in Tamil Nadu
Populated places established in 1845
Hill stations in Tamil Nadu
Mountains of Tamil Nadu
1845 establishments in British India